SJT may refer to:

 IATA code SJT for San Angelo Regional Airport
 Situational judgement test, a form of psychological test
 The Stephen Joseph Theatre in Scarborough